is a fictional character in the video game Persona 4.

Concept and creation
Naoto was created for Persona 4. She is a young detective who moves to Inaba, the setting of Persona 4, to solve a serial-murder case. Due to the gendered stereotypes of detectives and institutional misogyny in law enforcement, Naoto presents as a man in order to hide her gender. In the Japanese version, Naoto uses 'boku', a typically male pronoun, while interchangeably using he and she in the English version. Naoto's design in Persona 4 Arena was inspired by the character Raidou Kuzunoha. When designing Naoto for Persona 4: Dancing All Night, designer Kazuhisa Wada depicted her dancing style as more feminine to show Naoto embracing her feminine side more. Her dancing style comes from house music, with Wada noting that this dance style had a certain degree of sex appeal. Naoto is voiced by Romi Park in all appearances in Japanese. In English, Naoto was voiced Anna Graves in her initial appearances, and has been voiced by Valerie Arem from Persona 4 Arena Ultimax onward.

Appearances
Naoto appears in Persona 4 and is a detective trying to solve the murders in the game. Correctly suspecting that initial suspect Mitsuo Kubo is merely a copycat killer, Naoto uses herself as bait by appearing on TV and allowing herself to be kidnapped by the culprit. The group follows Naoto to the TV world, where Naoto is confronted by her Shadow, who expresses their frustration with her birth sex and at being treated like a child by the police. Naoto explains after Shadow Naoto has been defeated due to the male-oriented nature of the police department, which is why she had been presenting as male. Once Naoto comes to understand her feelings, her Shadow turns into the Persona , a robotic humanoid wearing a blue suit jacket that has an insect-like head and butterfly-like wings.

Following Naoto's recovery from her time in the TV world, she joins the protagonists in finding the culprit, having gained clues about his method thanks to her kidnapping. Throughout Yu's interactions with Naoto, she regains her passion for being a detective. Depending on the player's actions, Naoto can become intimate with Yu. Naoto also decides that she isn't a detective just to uphold her family tradition, but because she wants to be and thoroughly enjoy it no matter her gender or age. Her Persona then evolves into , a humanoid in a white and blue traditional armed forces dress uniform with a more bird-like appearance. In the game's ending, Naoto decides to stay in Inaba, unsure what to do now that the case is closed. In Persona 4 Golden, Naoto gets the new Persona , whose outfit is red and blue, and has long, flowing blonde hair.

Naoto appears as a playable character in Persona 4 Arena, where she is pursuing the character Mitsuru Kirijo from Persona 3. She later appears in Persona 4: Dancing All Night.

A novel that takes place one year after Persona 4 was released starring Naoto called Persona 4 x Detective Naoto, where she is investigating the disappearance of her old friend Touko Aoi. This novel was made by Dengeki Bunko.

In Persona 5, Naoto is briefly mentioned on a TV special on 4/29 as, "the original Detective Prince" who was then being succeeded by the "new Detective Prince."

Reception
Naoto has received overall positive  reception. Kimberley Wallace of Game Informer ranked her as one of the best Persona characters. Geoff Thew of Hardcore Gamer found Naoto to be attractive due in part to her detective work. Andrew Clouther of GameZone expressed skepticism with how Naoto was being designed for Persona 4: Dancing All Night, feeling that Naoto depicted in a sexual light felt unlike her and expressed concern that it would be used to justify "fan-service." A swimsuit costume that Naoto wears in Dancing All Night was described as "conservative" by Matt Sainsbury of Digitally Downloaded, who felt it fit her character. Mike Cosimano regarded her as a great character due to her pragmatism and quality detective work. Janine Hawkins of Paste Magazine praised her for her outfit, feeling that few could pull it off as well.

Naoto's gender identity and status as a queer character has been the subject of discussion from critics. She has been interpreted as both a cross-dressing woman and a trans man. Vrai Kaiser of The Mary Sue was initially hoping to find a "kindred spirit" with Naoto, but grew upset when they discovered that this was not the case. Michael Higham of GameSpot felt that certain choices players could make regarding her gender identity were insensitive.

References

Female characters in video games
Fictional characters with evocation or summoning abilities
Fictional cross-dressers
Fictional detectives
Fictional gunfighters in video games
Fictional high school students
Fictional Japanese people in video games
Orphan characters in video games
Persona 4 characters
Sega protagonists
Teenage characters in video games
Video game characters introduced in 2008
Video game characters who have mental powers